Albrecht von Mutzschen otherwise Albrecht II of Meissen or Albrecht II von Mutzschen (died 24 July 1266) was Bishop of Meissen from 1258 to 1266.

Albrecht was a member of the noble von Mutzschen family (later also von Motzin). He was a canon of Meissen Cathedral and provost of the collegiate church of Wurzen. His episcopate, about which there is little information, coincided with the Interregnum and the War of the Thuringian Succession.

Albrecht died in Löbnitz. He was buried on 1 August 1266 in Meissen Cathedral. Fragments of his sarcophagus survive. It was discovered in the 18th century. Despite gaps in the inscriptions it was possible to date it. On the lid a scratched drawing of a mitre and crosier is distinguishable.

References

Sources 
 Eduard Machatschek: Geschichte der Bischöfe des Hochstiftes Meissen in chronologischer Reihenfolge (...), pp. 190–199. Dresden 1884

External links
 Christian Hillen: Albrecht II. von Mutzschen. In: Institut für Sächsische Geschichte und Volkskunde (ed.): Sächsische Biografie

Roman Catholic bishops of Meissen
1266 deaths
Year of birth unknown